Queen Myeongseong (13 June 1642 – 21 January 1684) (명성왕후 김씨) of the Cheongpung Kim clan, was a posthumous name bestowed to the wife and queen consort of Yi Yeon, King Hyeonjong, the 18th Joseon monarch. She was queen consort of Joseon from 1659 until her husband's death in 1674, after which she was honoured as Royal Queen Dowager Hyeonryeol (현렬왕대비).

She was a wise and intelligent figure, but her fierce personality was said to be the reason why her husband did not have any concubines. The Southerners mocked her as a reincarnation of Queen Munjeong because of her intervention in the politics.

Biography
The future queen was born in Jangtongbang (Hangul: 장통방, Hanja: 長通坊) on 13 June 1642 during the reign of King Injo as the only daughter within four sons. Her father, Kim Woo-myeong, was a member of the Cheongpung Kim clan. Her mother was a member of the Eunjin Song clan.

In 1651, she was arranged to marry the Crown Prince to which her status and title changed to Crown Princess Consort Kim (왕세자빈 김씨, 王世子嬪 金氏) or (빈궁 김씨, 嬪宮 金氏). Her parents also received royal titles; her father received the royal title of “Internal Prince Cheongpung” (청풍부원군 淸風府院君, Cheongpung Buwongun), and her mother received the royal title of “Internal Princess Consort Deokeun of the Eunjin Song clan” (덕은부부인 송씨 德恩府夫人 宋氏, Deokeun Bubuin). Through her younger brother, Kim Seok-yeon, Queen Hyoui is her great-great-grandniece.

Her husband ascended the throne as the 18th Joseon monarch, (temple name: Hyeonjong) in 1659, automatically making her the queen consort. During her husband's reign, she and the King had one son and four daughters; only one died in infancy. The Queen gave birth to an unnamed daughter in 1658, Princess Myeongseon in 1659, Yi Sun in 1661, Princess Myeonghye in 1663, and Princess Myeongan in 1665. In 1667, Yi Sun was appointed as heir to the throne with title Crown Prince Myeongbo.

The Queen was a wise and intelligent figure, but her fierce personality was said to be the reason her husband did not have any concubines throughout his lifetime. When her husband died and Crown Prince Myeongbo was crowned as the 19th Joseon monarch (temple name: Sukjong) in 1674, she honoured as Queen Dowager Hyeonryeol (현렬왕대비).

Hyeonryeol frequently intervened in the court, criticizing the Southerners (Namin) and framed Grand Prince Inpyeong’s sons (Princes Bokchang, Bokseon, and Bokpyeong) with the accusation of adultery with the palace maids. The reason was that she viewed them as threats to her son’s position.

However, there was no evidence to support her accusation and because of her claim, Kim Woo-myeong, the Queen Dowager’s father, ended up being the suspect of initiating the slander against the princes. Hyeonryeol took it up to herself and knelt outside her quarters, pleading for her son to prove the princes’ crime. In the end, Sukjong exiled the three princes and the Southerners mocked her as a reincarnation of Queen Munjeong because of her intervention in the politics. Kim Woo-myeong chose to confine himself in his house following the incident as he felt humiliated, and he died because of severe depression.

After hearing about Sukjong’s relationship with a palace attendant (Jang Ok-jeong), Hyeonryeol sent Jang Ok-jeong out of the palace, since she apparently believed her low status would make the woman ignorant and wicked. However, the real reason was that the woman’s family background as Southerners made the queen believe that she entered the palace to become a spy for the Southerners. She set up a ceremony to pray for her son’s recovery after Sukjong fell unconscious. Hyeonryeol was a firm believer of Shamanism and upon consulting with a shaman, decided to pray and get doused with water while wearing summer clothes despite it being winter. She was hit with a bad flu in January and died in the same month on 21 January 1684 in Changdeok Palace’s Jeoseung Hall.

Although the ministers urged for the shaman to be executed, Sukjong decided to exile her. For her posthumous title, “Myeong” (명, 明) was for being cautious and “Seong” (성, 聖) was for spreading goodness and simplicity; being posthumously honoured as Queen Myeongseong (명성왕후 明聖王后, Myeongseong Wanghu).

Family  
Parent

 Father − Kim Woo-myeong (김우명, 金佑明) (1619–1675)
 Grandfather − Kim Yuk (김육, 金堉) (23 August 1580 – 1 October 1658)
 Great-Grandfather − Kim Heung-woo (김흥우, 金興宇)
 Great-Great-Grandfather − Kim Bi (김비, 金棐)
 Great-Grandmother − Lady Jo of the Pungyang Jo clan (풍양 조씨)
 Grandmother − Lady Yun of the Papyeong Yun clan (파평 윤씨)
 Uncle − Kim Jwa-myeong (김좌명, 金佐明) (1616–1671)
 Aunt-in-law − Lady Shin Ji-kang (신지강, 申止康) of the Pyeongsan Shin (평산 신씨) (1617—? )
 Cousin − Kim Seok-ju (김석주, 金錫胄) (1634 – 20 September 1684) 
 Cousin-in-law - Lady Yi of the Jeonju Yi clan (전주 이씨)
 First cousin - Kim Do-yeon (김도연, 金道淵)
 First cousin-in-law - Lady Jeong of the Dongrae Jeong clan (동래 정씨)
 Cousin-in-law - Lady Hwang of the Changwon Hwang clan (창원 황씨); daughter of Hwang Il-ho (황일호, 黃一皓)
 Cousin − Lady Kim of the Cheongpung Kim clan (청풍 김씨)
 Aunt − Lady Kim of the Cheongpung Kim clan (청풍 김씨)
 Uncle-in-law − Hwang Do-myeong (황도명, 黃道明)
 Mother − Internal Princess Consort Deokeun of the Eunjin Song clan (덕은부부인 은진 송씨, 德恩府夫人 恩津 宋氏) (1621 - 1660)
 Grandfather − Song Guk-taek (송국택, 宋國澤)
 Grandmother − Lady Kang of the Jinju Kang clan (진주 강씨, 晋州 姜氏)

Sibling

 Older brother − Kim Man-ju (김만주, 金萬周)
 Younger brother − Kim Seok-ik (김석익, 金錫翼)
 Niece - Lady Kim of the Cheongpung Kim clan (청풍 김씨)
 Nephew-in-law - Hong Jong-yeon (홍중연, 洪重衍)
 Younger brother − Kim Seok-yeon (김석연, 金錫衍) (1648 - 17 August 1723)
 Sister-in-law − Lady Yi of the Jeonju Yi clan (정경부인 전주 이씨) 
 Nephew − Kim Do-je (김도제, 金道濟)
 Nephew − Kim Do-ham (김도함, 金道涵)
 Nephew − Kim Do-heub (김도흡, 金道洽)
 Grandnephew − Kim Seong-chae (김성채, 金聖采)
 Grandnephew − Kim Seong-hyu (김성휴, 金聖休); became the adoptive son of Kim Do-ham
 Nephew − Kim Do-hyeob (김도협, 金道浹); became the adoptive son of Kim Seok-dal
 Younger brother − Kim Seok-dal (김석달, 金錫達)
 Sister-in-law − Lady Yi of the Jeonju Yi clan (전주 이씨)
 Younger half-brother - Kim Seok-gu (김석구, 金錫耉)

Consort

 Husband − King Hyeonjong of Joseon (현종, 顯宗) (14 March 1641 - 17 September 1674)
 Father-in-law − King Hyojong of Joseon (효종대왕, 孝宗大王) (3 July 1619 - 23 August 1659)
 Mother-in-law − Queen Inseon of the Deoksu Jang clan (인선왕후 장씨, 仁宣王后 張氏) (9 February 1619 - 19 March 1674)

Issue

 Unnamed daughter (1658 - 1658)
 Daughter − Princess Myeongseon (명선공주, 明善公主) (1659 - 12 September 1673)
 Son-in-law − Maeng Man-taek (맹만택, 孟萬澤) of the Sinchang Maeng clan (신창 맹씨, 新昌 孟氏) (1660 - 1710)
 Son − Yi Sun, King Sukjong (숙종대왕, 肅宗大王) (7 October 1661 - 12 January 1720)
 Daughter-in-law − Queen Ingyeong of the Gwangsan Kim clan (인경왕후 김씨, 仁敬王后 金氏) (25 October 1661 - 16 December 1680)
 Daughter-in-law − Queen Inhyeon of the Yeoheung Min clan (인현왕후 민씨, 仁顯王后 閔氏) (15 May 1667 - 16 September 1701)
 Daughter-in-law − Queen Inwon of the Gyeongju Kim clan (인원왕후 김씨, 仁元王后 金氏) (3 November 1687 - 13 May 1757)
 Daughter − Princess Myeonghye (명혜공주, 明惠公主) (12 September 1663 - 11 June 1673)
 Son-in-law − Shin Yo-gyeong (신요경, 申堯卿) of the Pyeongsan Shin clan (평산 신씨, 平山 申氏)
 Daughter − Yi On-Hui, Princess Myeongan (이온희 명안공주, 李溫姬 明安公主) (30 January 1665 - 16 May 1687)
 Son-in-law − Oh Tae-ju (오태주, 吳泰周) of the Haeju Oh clan (해주 오씨, 海州 吳氏) (1668 - 1716)
 Adoptive grandson − Oh Won (오원, 吳瑗) (1700 - 1740); son of Oh Jin-ju (오진주, 吳晋周)

In popular culture
 Portrayed by Kim Hae-sook in the 1988 MBC TV series 500 Years of Joseon:Queen In Hyun.
Portrayed by Kyeon Mi-ri in the 1995 SBS TV series Jang Hee Bin.
Portrayed by Kim Young-ae in the 2002 KBS TV series Royal Story:Jang Hee Bin.
Portrayed by Park Jung-soo in the 2010 MBC TV series Dong Yi.
 Portrayed by Lee Ga-hyun in the 2012 MBC TV series The King's Doctor. 
 Portrayed by Kim Sun-kyung in the 2013 SBS TV series Jang Ok-jung, Living by Love.

References

Notes

1642 births
1684 deaths
Royal consorts of the Joseon dynasty
Korean queens consort
17th-century Korean women